Admetula afra is a species of sea snail, a marine gastropod mollusk in the family Cancellariidae, called the nutmeg snails.

The specific name afra is a feminine of afer, that means "African".

Description

Distribution
South Africa

References

External links
 Hemmen J. (2007) Recent Cancellariidae. Annotated and illustrated catalogue of Recent Cancellariidae. Privately published, Wiesbaden. 428 pp. [With amendments and corrections taken from Petit R.E. (2012) A critique of, and errata for, Recent Cancellariidae by Jens Hemmen, 2007. Conchologia Ingrata 9: 1–8.

Cancellariidae
Gastropods described in 2000